The 1979 World Archery Championships was the 30th edition of the event. It was held in Berlin, West Germany on 14–22 July 1979 and was organised by World Archery Federation (FITA).

The 1979 event marked the first Championship gold medals for South Korea, in the women's team and individual events, have since dominated World Archery Federation events until the present day.

Medals summary

Recurve

Medals table

References

External links
 World Archery website
 Complete results

World Archery Championships
International archery competitions hosted by Germany
Sports competitions in Berlin
World Championship
World Archery